Ajdarra is a town in the Federally Administered Tribal Areas of Pakistan. It is located at 34° 35'40″ N, 71° 27' 45″ E with an altitude of 836 metres (2,746 feet).

References

Populated places in Khyber Pakhtunkhwa